Pleurotrocha is a genus of rotifers belonging to the family Notommatidae.

The species of this genus are found in Europe and Antarctica.

Species:

Pleurotrocha altanica 
Pleurotrocha altila 
Pleurotrocha altilis 
Pleurotrocha atlantica 
Pleurotrocha aurea 
Pleurotrocha chalicodis 
Pleurotrocha channa 
Pleurotrocha daphnicola 
Pleurotrocha elegans 
Pleurotrocha fontanetoi 
Pleurotrocha larvarum 
Pleurotrocha petromyzon 
Pleurotrocha robusta 
Pleurotrocha sigmoidea 
Pleurotrocha thrua

References

Rotifer genera
Ploima